Paveh County is in Kermanshah province, Iran. The capital of the county is the city of Paveh. At the 2006 census, the county's population was 51,755 in 13,309 households. The following census in 2011 counted 56,837 people in 15,929 households. At the 2016 census, the county's population was 60,431 in 18,471 households.

Administrative divisions

The population history and structural changes of Paveh County's administrative divisions over three consecutive censuses are shown in the following table. The latest census shows three districts, five rural districts, and five cities.

References

 

Counties of Kermanshah Province